Lancaster Downtown Historic District is a national historic district located at Lancaster, Lancaster County, South Carolina.  It encompasses 12 contributing commercial buildings in central business district of Lancaster.   The  buildings date from about 1880 to 1935.  It is the most intact section of Lancaster's early business area. Notable building include the United States Post Office, the Springs Block, the Farmers’ Bank and Trust Company Building, and the Bank of Lancaster/Opera House.

It was added to the National Register of Historic Places in 1984.

References

Commercial buildings on the National Register of Historic Places in South Carolina
Historic districts on the National Register of Historic Places in South Carolina
Buildings and structures in Lancaster County, South Carolina
National Register of Historic Places in Lancaster County, South Carolina